Linare is a community council located in the Leribe District of Lesotho. Its population in 2006 was 24,713.

Villages
The community of Linare includes the villages of Borantisi (Khanyane), Fothane, Ha 'Malesaoana, Ha Kabelo (Likoting), Ha Kampa, Ha Kheola, Ha Khoarai, Ha Lebake, Ha Lepoqo, Ha Makhabo (Sebothoane), Ha Makoko (Khanyane), Ha Maphika (Sebothoane), Ha Matata, Ha Mohale, Ha Mokoko, Ha Molatoli (Khobotlong), Ha Molibeli, Ha Molibetsane, Ha Moliboea (Khanyane), Ha Monki, Ha Mphuthing (Sebothoane), Ha Ntsutsu, Ha Patlo, Ha Phephetho (Khanyane), Ha Sekota, Ha Setsumi, Ha Setsumi, Ha Tiela, Ha Tlai-Tlai, Ha Tsenase (Khanyane), Ha Tsotelo, Khokhotsaneng (Khanyane), Konkotia (Khanyane), Letsoapong (Ha Monki), Lisemeng, Mankoaneng, Maqhaoe (Ha Timitia), Masaleng, Ntloana-Tšoana (Khanyane), Sheba, Subeng, Temong, Thabana-Ea-Matsa, Tlai-Tlai Race Course and Tsifa-Li-Mali.

References

External links
 Google map of community villages

Populated places in Leribe District